The Independent Review: A Journal of Political Economy is a quarterly peer-reviewed academic journal covering political economy and the critical analysis of government policy. It is published by the Independent Institute, a conservative libertarian think tank in the United States. The journal was established in 1996.

History 

The journal was established in 1996. Until 2013, Robert Higgs was the editor-in-chief. In 2013, Higgs became "editor at large" and was succeeded by Robert Whaples.

Abstracting and indexing 
The journal is abstracted and indexed in:

According to the Journal Citation Reports, the journal has a 2012 impact factor of 0.237.

References

External links 
 

Libertarian magazines published in the United States
Political science journals
English-language journals
Quarterly journals
Libertarian publications
Publications established in 1996